Virna Cristine Dantas Dias (born August 31, 1971 in Natal) is a retired volleyball player from Brazil. She represented her native country at the 1996 Summer Olympics in Atlanta, Georgia. There, she claimed the bronze medal with the Women's National Team.

Dias also competed at the 1999 FIVB Volleyball Women's World Cup, and at the 2000 Summer Olympics, winning the bronze once again, and the 2004 Summer Olympics in Athens, Greece.

Clubs
  Lufkin (1986–1990)
  Virtus Reggio Calabria (1991–1992)
  Ribeirão Preto (1992–1993)
  BCN Guarujá (1993–1994)
  Minas Tênis Clube (1994–1995)
  Tietê (1995–1996)
  Minas Tênis Clube (1996–1997)
  União (1997–1998)
  Uniban (1998–1999)
  Flamengo (1999–2001)
  BCN Osasco (2001–2003)
  Minas Tênis Clube (2003–2004)
  Chieri Torino (2004–2005)
  Rio de Janeiro (2008–2009)

Awards

Individuals
 1994–95 Brazilian Superliga – "Best Server" 
 1995–96 Brazilian Superliga – "Best Server" 
 1997 South American Championship – "Best Spiker"
 1998–99 Brazilian Superliga – "Most Valuable Player" 
 1998–99 Brazilian Superliga – "Best Spiker" 
 1999 FIVB World Grand Prix – "Most Valuable Player"
 1999 FIVB World Grand Prix – "Best Scorer"
 1999 FIVB World Grand Prix – "Best Receiver"
 2000–01 Brazilian Superliga – "Most Valuable Player" 
 2001 FIVB World Grand Champions Cup – "Best Receiver" 
 2004–05 CEV Cup – "Best Receiver"

References

 databaseOlympics

1971 births
Living people
People from Natal, Rio Grande do Norte
Brazilian women's volleyball players
Olympic volleyball players of Brazil
Volleyball players at the 1996 Summer Olympics
Volleyball players at the 2000 Summer Olympics
Volleyball players at the 2004 Summer Olympics
Olympic bronze medalists for Brazil
Olympic medalists in volleyball
Medalists at the 2000 Summer Olympics
Medalists at the 1996 Summer Olympics
Pan American Games medalists in volleyball
Pan American Games gold medalists for Brazil
Volleyball players at the 1999 Pan American Games
Medalists at the 1999 Pan American Games
Sportspeople from Rio Grande do Norte